HMAS Launceston (ACPB 94) is an Armidale-class patrol boat of the Royal Australian Navy (RAN).

Design and construction

The semi-displacement vee hull is fabricated from aluminium alloy, and each vessel is built to a combination of Det Norske Veritas standards for high-speed light craft and RAN requirements.

The main armament of the Armidale class is a Rafael Typhoon stabilised  gun mount fitted with an M242 Bushmaster autocannon. Two  machine guns are also carried. Boarding operations are performed by two , waterjet propelled rigid-hulled inflatable boats (RHIBs). Each RHIB is stored in a dedicated cradle and davit, and is capable of operating independently from the patrol boat as it carries its own communications, navigation, and safety equipment.

Each patrol boat has a standard ship's company of 21 personnel, with a maximum of 29. The Armidales do not have a permanently assigned ship's company; instead, they are assigned to divisions at a ratio of two vessels to three companies, which rotate through the vessels and allow the Armidales to spend more time at sea, without compromising sailors' rest time or training requirements. A 20-berth auxiliary accommodation compartment was included in the design for the transportation of soldiers, illegal fishermen, or unauthorised arrivals; in the latter two cases, the compartment could be secured from the outside. However, a malfunction in the sewerage treatment facilities aboard  in August 2006 pumped hydrogen sulphide and carbon monoxide into the compartment, non-fatally poisoning four sailors working inside, after which use of the compartment for accommodation was banned across the class.

Launceston was constructed by Austal at their shipyard in Henderson, Western Australia. She was commissioned in Launceston, Tasmania on 22 September 2007.

Operational history
She is based in Cairns and performs border protection and fisheries protection patrols.

Launceston was used for pick-up filming during the creation of the second season of Australian drama series Sea Patrol in 2008. The footage was conflated with the main footage of sister ship  to create the fictional HMAS Hammersley, the ship the series is set on.

Citations

References
Books

 The chapter is available separately as Semaphore, Issue 4, 2006 in PDF and HTML formats.

Journal and news articles

Websites and other media

External links
Royal Australian Navy webpage for HMAS Launceston (III)

Ships built by Austal
Naval ships of Australia
Armidale-class patrol boats
2007 ships